The river Glems is a right tributary of the river Enz in Baden-Württemberg, Germany and around  long. The spring is located in the south-west of Stuttgart. On the way to the confluence into the Enz next to Unterriexingen (a quarter of Markgröningen) it passes the districts of Böblingen and Ludwigsburg.

The river Glems gives its name to a wooded mountain range called Glemswald in the Böblingen district of Stuttgart Region.

Since 1575, water from the upper Glems is collected in the Pfaffensee reservoir and redirected towards Stuttgart through a tunnel. First it was discharged in the Nesenbach, since 1874 into municipal waterworks.

References

Rivers of Baden-Württemberg
Rivers of Germany